Eucnide urens, also known as desert rock nettle or desert stingbush, is a shrub which is native to desert areas in California, Arizona, Utah and Baja California.  Other common names are velcro plant and vegetable velcro.

The  flowers, which appear from spring to early summer, are cream or pale yellow with 5 petals and are 2.5 to 5 cm long. The coarsely serrated leaves are 2 to 6.5 cm long with stinging hairs which are also found on the stems and buds. It grows in the desert on cliffs and dry, rocky places.

The plant is round and bushy and is usually between 30 and 60 cm in height and is often found on cliff faces. Desert bighorn sheep feed on the flowers.

Notes

References

Spellenberg, R. (1979) Field Guide to North American Wildflowers - Western Region, National Audubon Society.
Hall, Clarence A., Jr. (1991) Natural History of the White-Inyo Range, University of California Press.

Loasaceae
Flora of Arizona
Flora of California
Flora of Utah
Flora of Baja California
Flora without expected TNC conservation status